Mister Whiskers - Monkey Business was released in 1999, under ABC Music's on compact Disc. It was nominated for the 2000 ARIA Music Award for Best Children's Album but lost to Hi-5's Jump and Jive with Hi-5.

Track listing
Monkey Business (F. Henri)
That's What Monkeys Do (F. Henri)
The Tiger (Z.R. McHenry)
Lots of Animals (Trad.- F. Henri)
Monkey Band (F. Henri)
This is The Way (Trad. - F. Henri)
Vegetable Rhyming Song (F. Henri)
Boom, Boom (Trad. - F. Henri)
Spring Song (Z.R. McHenry)
Smiggy Goes Walkies (F. Henri)
Wash Your Dirty Face (Trad. - F. Henri)
Blow Wind Blow (F. Henri)
The Bear (Z.R. McHenry)
Monkey Holiday (F. Henri)
The Camel (Z.R. McHenry)
Tell Me Yes, Tell Me True (F. Henri)
Five Coconuts (Trad. - F. Henri)
Hush-a-bye (F. Henri)
1,2,3,4,5 (Trad. - F. Henri)
Smiggy Goes Pop (F. Henri)
Don't Believe a Word I Say (F. Henri)
Water in My Shoe (F. Henri)
Picture in a Frame (Tom Waits, Kathleen Brennan)
Swinging on a Star (Johnny Burke, Jimmy Van Heusen)

1999 albums
Franciscus Henri albums